Turkey was the first country in the world to recognize the independence of Turkmenistan during the period of dissolution of the Soviet Union and first country that opened an embassy in the newly independent country. Turkmenistan has an embassy in Ankara and a consulate general in Istanbul. Both countries are full members of the Economic Cooperation Organization, Organisation of Islamic Cooperation, International Organization of Turkic Culture and Organization for Security and Co-operation in Europe. The two countries share close cultural connections. Both have a majority Sunni Muslim population, and both are predominantly inhabited by Turkic peoples, both the Turkish and Turkmen languages belong to the Oghuz subgroup of Turkic languages. Turkey is one of the 47 countries in the world that holders of a Turkmen passport can visit without visa.

Economic relations
Net trade between two countries in 2009 was 1.6 billion USD and that number constituted 52% increase compare with the numbers for 2008. At that time Turkey was the second largest trade partner for Turkmenistan. As of 2013 more than 600 companies from Turkey had implemented over 1270 investment projects with about 1200 of them having the total value of 15 billion USD. Increasing economic cooperation between two countries has made Turkmenistan Turkey's first partner in Central Asia by number of projects implemented.

See also
 Foreign relations of Turkey
 Foreign relations of Turkmenistan 
 Turks in Turkmenistan

References

 
Turkmenistan
Turkey